Anthony Davis (born May 21, 1982) is a former running back in the Canadian Football League. Davis was born in Plainfield, New Jersey and attended the University of Wisconsin where he played football for four years. He was selected in the 2005 NFL Draft by the Indianapolis Colts in the seventh and final round (243rd pick overall).

Professional career 
Davis, nicknamed the A-train, played two seasons with the Hamilton Tiger-Cats, where he carried the ball 86 times for 457 yards and one touchdown. In December, 2007, he was traded to the Toronto Argonauts in exchange for receiver Frank Murphy and in April, 2008, the Argos released him.

He currently serves as Director of Inter-Cultural Programs at Loras College in Dubuque, Iowa.

References

External links
 Toronto Argonauts profile

1982 births
Living people
Sportspeople from Plainfield, New Jersey
Players of American football from New Jersey
American football running backs
Wisconsin Badgers football players
American players of Canadian football
Canadian football running backs
Toronto Argonauts players